Aslan Ruslanovich Dyshekov (born 15 January 1987) is a Russian professional football player. He plays for FC Kuban-Holding Pavlovskaya.

Club career
He made his Russian Premier League debut for PFC Spartak Nalchik on 20 September 2010 in a game against FC Spartak Moscow.

External links
 
 
 

1987 births
People from Baksan
Living people
Russian footballers
Association football midfielders
PFC Spartak Nalchik players
FC SKA Rostov-on-Don players
FC Dynamo Stavropol players
FC Angusht Nazran players
FC Irtysh Omsk players
FC Sibir Novosibirsk players
FC Volgar Astrakhan players
FC Armavir players
FC Urozhay Krasnodar players
Russian Premier League players
Russian First League players
Russian Second League players
Sportspeople from Kabardino-Balkaria